Flaveria palmeri is a rare Mexican plant species of Flaveria within the family Asteraceae. It has been found only in the States of Coahuila and Nuevo León in northeastern Mexico.

Flaveria palmeri grows in dry gypsum soils in the Chihuahuan Desert. One plant can produce numerous small yellow flower heads in loose, branching arrays. Each head contains 3-8 disc flowers plus a few ray flowers.

References 

palmeri
Endemic flora of Mexico
Flora of Northeastern Mexico
Plants described in 1903